Low side or lowside can refer to:

 A public computer network (e.g. the Internet), in the context of air-gapped computer networks
 Lowsider, a type of motorcycle accident